A phenine nanotube is a derivation or variant of short carbon nanotubes first reported in 2019.

They have a precise cylindrical structure with pores and a length index of 7, and have been made by a 9 step process starting with 1,3-dibromobenzene.

References

Carbon nanotubes